The Cedars, also known as the Collier-Callahan House is a historic mansion in Jackson, Tennessee, U.S.. It was built in 1930 for William Collier after Adam Huntsman's old house burnt down.

The house was designed in the Colonial Revival architectural style. It has been listed on the National Register of Historic Places since May 5, 1999.

References

Houses on the National Register of Historic Places in Tennessee
Colonial Revival architecture in Tennessee
Houses completed in 1930
Buildings and structures in Madison County, Tennessee